Olaf Broch (4 August 1867, Horten28 January 1961, Oslo) was a Norwegian linguist. He was born in Horten, and was a brother of children's writer Lagertha Broch, zoologist Hjalmar Broch, and social worker Nanna Broch. He was a professor of Slavic languages at the University of Oslo from 1900 to 1937. Among his works are Slawische Phonetik  from 1911, Håndbok i elementær fonetikk  from 1921, and Proletariatets diktatur  from 1923. He translated works by Leo Tolstoy and Fyodor Dostoyevsky into Norwegian. He was decorated Commander of the Order of St. Olav in 1946.

Broch was a pioneer in the field of Slavic studies in Norway and one of the first scholars to use modern methods to describe the phonetics of Slavic languages.

References

Notes

Further reading 

1867 births
1961 deaths
People from Horten
Linguists from Norway
Academic staff of the University of Oslo
Corresponding members of the Saint Petersburg Academy of Sciences
Corresponding Members of the Russian Academy of Sciences (1917–1925)
Corresponding Members of the USSR Academy of Sciences
20th-century Norwegian translators